Mota Gharbi is a village in the Dina Tehsil in District Jhelum in Punjab, Pakistan.

Geography 
Mota Gharbi is a village in the Dina Tehsil in District Jhelum in Punjab, Pakistan. The village has a population of about 1,771 and contains 293 households according to the Government of Punjab. It is about 11.3 kilometres (7.0 mi) from Dina. Three mahallahs in the village are the Bhurla mahalla, Apprla mahalla, and Sehno na Khoh mahalla. Other settlements nearby include Dhok Gujral and  Dhok Padhal. The village has several historic qabristans (graveyards).

Demographics 
The village has a population of about 1,771 and contains 293 households according to the Government of Punjab.

Transport 
Three roads lead to Mota Gharbi village. The first road goes through Rohtan Fort from Dina Tehsil while the second goes through Khukha.This leaves GT Road near Dina police station. Third Road leaves GT Road at main Choke (Mangla) towards railway station and turing right at Bahg (Baghan) passing through Guggar Kalan. The first road was constructed in the 1980s by General Aslam Mirza, but had to be rebuilt by Pervez Musharraf due to decay. In 2020, under the rule of Imran Khan, the road was rebuilt again.

Historical places 

Mota Gharbi has historical sites such as the Jheera Tomb and the old Qabristan near Kassi. Jheera has fallen into disrepair.

Welfare association 
The Mota Gharbi Welfare Association (MGWA), is an organisation in the village that oversees most of the village's work such as cleaning and repairing streets, growing trees, and helping people in need. The organisation has helped in the cleaning of roads, covering drains, and others. The association is now converting street lights to run on solar energy.

The motto of MGWA is "Mota Gharbi Green and Clean".

Mosques 
 Jamia Masjid Mota Gharbi
 Masjid Hafiz Sahib
 Masjid Noor-al-Islaam
 Masjid Jahandaad
 Masjid Ali
 Masjid Boys High School

Education

Government High School Mota Gharbi for Boys 
Govt High School Mota Gharbi is located in Jhelum District. 356 students, 16 teachers, and 12 classrooms make up the school.

Dar-e-Arqam School Mota Gharbi 
The Dar-e-Arqam school was the second private school in Mota Gharbi, built after the Alam Academy.

Alam Academy Mota Gharbi 
The Alam academy was the first private school in Mota Gharbi, founded by Sir Haroon Alam .

Health care

Basic Health Unit of Mota Gharbi 
The Basic Health Unit is a hospital in Mota Gharbi that provides healthcare to the village, Gagar, Dhook Padhal, Bodla, Kotyaam, and Gujral residents.

Apps Mota Gharbi Medical Dispensary 

The Apps Mota Gharbi Medical Dispensary provides medical services to residents of the village and nearby locations. It also serves as a field dispensary.

Dams 
A dam was built in Mota Gharbi to store rainwater. Dam repair work has been done by the Mota Gharbi Welfare Association.  According to the government, the dam is in a state of disrepair.

Graveyards
Several historic qabristans (graveyards) are present in Mota Gharbi. The qabristan in use now has graves more than a hundred years old. The planting of trees in the Qabristan started by Mr. Ismail Butt and the surrounding barbed wire was also laid with his efforts to increase the number of trees. Later, due to construction of the wall around the cemetery was further improved. From the beginning, people used to plant trees in the cemetery on their own, but after the establishment of the Mota Gharbi Welfare Association, the cleaning of the cemetery and growing new plants became systematic.

References

External links
Website of Mota Gharbi
GH School for Boys Mota Gharbi
location of Mota Gharbi
Basic Health Unit Mota Gharbi
GHS Mota Gharbi
Mota Gharbi Welfare Association
Population and household of Mota Gharbi
Habib Bank LTD Mota Gharbi 
Mota Gharbi and Khukha Post Office  

Populated places in Tehsil Dina